The Billboard China Top 100 was the music industry standard record chart in China for local songs, compiled by Nielsen-CCData and published weekly by Billboard China. Chart rankings are based on digital sales, radio play, and online streaming in China.

The short-lived chart was last updated on September 6, 2019.

List of number one songs

See also 

 Billboard China
 Billboard China Airplay/FL

References

External links
 

2019 establishments in China
2019 disestablishments in China
China Top 100
Chinese record charts
Top lists